Fred Weir is a Canadian journalist who lives in Moscow and specializes in Russian affairs. He is a Moscow correspondent for the Boston-based daily The Christian Science Monitor, and for the monthly Chicago magazine In These Times. He has been a regular contributor from Moscow to The Independent, South China Morning Post and The Canadian Press. He was also for 20 years the Moscow correspondent of Hindustan Times an Indian, English-language, daily newspaper based in Delhi. Weir is the co-author, along with David Michael Kotz, of Revolution from Above: The Demise of the Soviet System, published in 1996, which provides a new interpretation and research for the disintegration of the USSR.

Weir studied Russian and Soviet history at the University of Toronto. He lived on a kibbutz in Israel in 1973–74, travelled extensively around the Middle East, the USSR and Eastern Europe, before choosing to move to the Soviet Union to live and work as a journalist in 1986. He married Mariam Shaumian, a Russian-Armenian, in 1987. They have two children: Tanya, born in 1988, and Charlie, born in 2000.

References

Living people
Year of birth missing (living people)
Canadian newspaper reporters and correspondents
Jewish Canadian journalists